The 1952 New Zealand rugby league tour of Australia was the sixteenth tour by New Zealand's national rugby league team, and the twelfth tour to visit Australia. The thirteen-match tour included three Test Matches. 
Captained by Travers Hardwick and coached by Jim Amos, the Kiwis completed a successful tour, winning ten of the thirteen matches. The team recovered from losing the First Test Match, to win – in the space of five days – the Second and Third Tests and claim the series by a two-one margin.

Squad
The team was coached by Les Amos and managed by Bill Swift and Colin Siddle. Travers Hardwick was captain in all three Test Matches and in each of the eight other tour matches in which he appeared. Tommy Baxter captained the side against Newcastle. 
The Rugby League News published a Team Photo, Player Details (Occupation, Age, Height and Weight) and pen portraits of the tourists: Backs and Forwards which listed their club and provincial team.

Matches

1st Test

2nd Test

3rd Test

Sources

References

New Zealand national rugby league team tours
Rugby league tour
New Zealand rugby league tour
Rugby league tours of Australia